Malcolm Williams (born November 22, 1987) is a former American football cornerback.

College career
He played college football at Texas Christian University.

Professional career

New England Patriots
He was drafted by the New England Patriots with the 219th overall pick in the 7th round of the 2011 NFL Draft. On April 29, 2013, the Patriots released Williams.

Colorado Ice
Williams played for the Colorado Ice of the Indoor Football League (IFL) in 2014.

New Orleans VooDoo
On October 28, 2014, Williams was assigned to the New Orleans VooDoo. He was later placed on league suspension by the VooDoo.

Nebraska Danger
On April 15, 2015, Williams signed with the Nebraska Danger of the IFL.

References

External links
TCU Horned Frogs bio

1987 births
Living people
American football cornerbacks
Colorado Crush (IFL) players
Nebraska Danger players
New England Patriots players
New Orleans VooDoo players
People from Grand Prairie, Texas
Players of American football from Texas
Sportspeople from the Dallas–Fort Worth metroplex
TCU Horned Frogs football players
Trinity Valley Cardinals football players